Ingolfsland Station is an abandoned railway station on the Rjukan Line at Rjukan in Tinn, Norway. It was in use from 1913 to 1970 by Norsk Transport, serving the southern suburbs of Rjukan.

History
The station opened as a stop on 1913 and was crucial for the commuter trains that transported workers from the outer parts of Rjukan to the plants. It was classified as a station in 1922 after the new building was built; the only brick construction along the line. It had two apartments and a waiting room, in total 200 square meters.

The station became unmanned in 1969 and was closed on May 31, 1970, when passenger transport on Rjukanbanen terminated. It was sold as a residence in 1985 to the association Odd Fellow, who have renovated it.

Notes

References

External links
 Norsk Jernbaneklubb entry 

Railway stations on the Rjukan Line
Railway stations in Tinn
Railway stations opened in 1913
Railway stations closed in 1970
Disused railway stations in Norway
1913 establishments in Norway
1970 disestablishments in Norway